Monopis crocicapitella, the pale-backed clothes moth, is a moth of the family Tineidae described by James Brackenridge Clemens in 1859. It has a nearly cosmopolitan distribution. It was first described from the eastern United States. It is particularly destructive of fabric and clothes. 

The wingspan is 10–16 mm. It is similar to Monopis obviella, but less distinctly-marked, with a darker dorsal streak and more speckled  forewing.  The ground colour of the hindwing is whitish grey or pale grey not  dark with a slight purple tinge as in M. obviella.  

In western Europe, adults are on wing from June to October.The larvae feed on dried animal and vegetable refuse. They have been found in debris, in a dead rat, pigeon guano, bird's nests, and stored products of vegetable origin such as flour, corn and felt. They also feed on textiles, as the species' common name implies, and are particularly destructive.A study undertaken on eleven English Heritage properties over several years before the winter of 2017-2018, showed that the number of moths captured in traps increased significantly during the study period.

References

Petersen, G., 1957: Die Genitalien der paläarktischen Tineiden (Lepidoptera: Tineidae). Beiträge zur Entomologie 7 (1/2): 55-176.

External links

UKMoths
Lepidoptera of Belgium

Lepiforum.de

Tineinae
Moths of Africa
Moths of Europe
Moths of New Zealand
Moths described in 1859
Taxa named by James Brackenridge Clemens